The Order of Klement Gottwald was established by the Czechoslovak government in February 1953. The original name of the Order was "Order of building of socialist homeland". The name of the Order was changed to "Order of Klement Gottwald - for building of socialist homeland" in 1955.

The Order was awarded for outstanding merit for realisation of the socialism system in Czechoslovakia obtained during the building of the state or during the battle on political, economic, social or cultural field, during increase of defense ability of the state or during battle with inside enemy.

The Order of Klement Gottwald was awarded by the President of the Republic. The awarded person received a certificate and booklet.

The star of the Order is made from gold, the obverse is red enameled. The arms of the stars have small gold beads on the end. The diameter of the star without the beads is 45 mm. In the middle of the star obverse was (i) golden medallion with the small state symbol (original type) or (ii) a gold medallion with the portrait of the first communist Czechoslovak president Klement Gottwald. On the obverse is a similar medallion with plastic sash and inscription"Za socialistickou vlast" (=for the socialist homeland) and two laurel leaves. The suspension is made from gold and consists of a strip with the abbreviation "ČSR" (types until 1960) or "ČSSR" (type after 1960) and from lime palms connected with a clasp.

Recipients

References

External links
 Order of Klement Gottwald (in English and Czech)
 

Awards established in 1953
Civil awards and decorations of Czechoslovakia
1953 establishments in Czechoslovakia
1989 disestablishments in Czechoslovakia
Orders of chivalry awarded to heads of state, consorts and sovereign family members